Path of Exile is a free-to-play action role-playing video game developed and published by Grinding Gear Games. Following an open beta phase, the game was released for Microsoft Windows in October 2013. A version for Xbox One was released in August 2017, and a PlayStation 4 version was released in March 2019.

Path of Exile takes place in the dark fantasy world, where the government of the island nation of Oriath exiles people to the continent of Wraeclast, a ruined continent home to many ancient gods. Taking control of an exile, players can choose to play as one of seven character classes – Marauder, Duelist, Ranger, Shadow, Witch, Templar, and Scion. Players are then tasked with fighting their way back to Oriath, defeating ancient gods and great evils during their journey.

Gameplay 
The player controls a single character from an overhead perspective and explores large outdoor areas and caves or dungeons, battling monsters and fulfilling quests from non-player characters (NPCs) to gain experience points and equipment. The game borrows heavily from the Diablo series, particularly Diablo II, which Path of Exile has been described as the spiritual successor of. All areas aside from the central encampments are procedurally generated for increased re-playability. While all players on a single server can freely mingle in encampments, gameplay outside of encampments is highly instanced, providing every player or party with an isolated map to freely explore.

Players can choose from seven available classes to play as (Duelist, Marauder, Ranger, Scion, Shadow, Templar and Witch). Each of these classes are aligned with one or two of the three core attributes: Strength, Dexterity, or Intelligence. The exception is the Scion, formerly a locked prestige class released in 2013, which is aligned with all three attributes. The different classes are not restricted from investing into skills not aligned with their core attributes, but will have easier access to skills that are aligned with their core attributes. Items are randomly generated from a wide variety of basic types and endowed with special properties and gem sockets. They come in different rarities with increasingly powerful properties. This makes a large part of gameplay dedicated to finding well-balanced and synergistic equipment. Skill gems can be placed in gem sockets of armor, weapons and some types of rings, giving them an active skill. As the character advances and levels up, the equipped skill gems also gain experience, allowing the skills themselves to level up and increase in potency.

Active skills can be modified by items known as Support Gems. Depending upon the number of linked sockets the player possesses, a primary attack or skill can be modified with increased attack speed, faster projectiles, multiple projectiles, chaining hits, life leech, auto-cast spells on critical strike, and more. Given limits on the number of sockets, players must prioritize gem usage. All classes share the same selection of 1,325 passive skills, from which the player can choose one each time their character levels up, and as an occasional quest reward. These passive skills improve the core attributes and grant further enhancements such as increased Mana, Health, damage, defenses, regeneration, speed, and more. Each one of the characters start on a different position on the passive skill tree. The passive skill tree is arranged in a complex network starting in separate trunks for each class (aligned with the permutations of the three core attributes). The player must therefore not only focus on maximizing all modifiers related to their primary offense and defense, but must also take care to select the most efficient path through the passive skill tree. As of the 3.0 Fall of Oriath Release, the maximum possible number of passive skill points was 123 (99 from leveling and 24 from quest rewards). Each class also has access to an Ascendancy class, which grants much stronger, specialized bonuses. Each class has three Ascendancy classes to choose from, except for the Scion, who only has one Ascendancy class that combines the elements of all other Ascendancy classes. Up to 8 Ascendancy skill points can be assigned out of 12 or 14.

Path of Exile is unusual among action role-playing games in that there is no in-game currency. The game's economy is based on bartering "currency items." Unlike traditional game currencies, these items have their own inherent uses (such as upgrading an item's rarity level, rerolling affixes, or improving an item's quality) and thus provide their own money sinks to prevent inflation. Most of these items are used to modify and upgrade equipment, though some identify items, create portals to town or grant skill refund points.

Leagues 
The game offers several alternate play modes. The following permanent leagues are available:
 Standard – The default gameplay league. Characters who die here respawn in the last city visited (with experience loss at higher levels).
 Hardcore (HC) – Characters cannot be resurrected but instead respawn back in the Standard league. This mode is analogous to permadeath in other games.
 Solo Self Found (SSF) – Characters cannot join a party with other players, and may not trade with other players. This type of gameplay forces characters to find or craft their own items.

Current temporary (challenge) leagues:
 The Forbidden Sanctum league.

Other leagues are usually designed for specific events. They have their own set of rules, item accessibility and aftermath. These rules widely vary depending on the league. For example, timed "Descent" league features another map set, new monster sets and rewards, but characters in this league are no longer available for playing after the league ends. "Turbo solo immolation" leagues, as another example, are running on the same maps as standard modes, but with much harder monsters, no partying, replacing physical damage with fire damage and monsters exploding on death—and return the survivors to Hardcore league (while dead characters resurrect in Standard). Racing leagues last between 30 minutes and 1 week. The permanent leagues have counterpart ladder leagues with different rulesets that last three months.

Synopsis

Setting
The game is set in a dark fantasy world. The player starts the game waking up on the shores of Wraeclast, a continent that once was the center of a mighty empire but is now a cursed land which serves as a penal colony for criminals and other unwanted individuals from the nearby Island of Oriath. Regardless of the reasons for their exile, players must now face the unforgiving wilderness and its dangerous inhabitants amidst the crumbling ruins and bloody secrets of the Eternal Empire and the Vaal civilization that came before, and band together with other exiles to survive.

Plot
High Templar Dominus exiles the player character, referred to as "Exile," from Oriath for some crime depending on which class the player chose. Exiles are sent to Wraeclast, a penal colony, where they kill various monsters and people who have been tormenting other exiles in Wraeclast. It is discovered that Dominus has been secretly working with his assistant Piety studying thaumaturgy and are the cause of many of the troubles in Wraeclast. The Exile finds and kills both of them. In the process, the Exile encounters a 200-year-old woman called Dialla who explains how a thaumaturgical "Rapture Device" created by a man called Malachai is being used to awaken and release "The Beast". The Exile travels to Highgate where they enter the Beast and kill Malachai.

Now that Wraeclast is apparently saved, the Exile returns to Oriath. The successor to Dominus, High Templar Avarius, has been abusing his ordained power of divinity. The corrupt templar are exercising their power to wrest control of Oriath, enslaving a race of people known as Karui. The Exile takes advantage of the ongoing Karui slave rebellion and overthrows the templar order by killing Avarius and defeating the Templar god "Innocence". After defeating Innocence, his brother Sin returns and informs the Exile that by killing the Beast, the Exile has inadvertently caused the old gods of the world to reawaken. The formerly oppressed Karui, now empowered by their god Kitava, are running rampant in Oriath, destroying whatever they can find. Sin takes the Exile to fight Kitava, but the Exile fails. Sin explains that the essence of the Beast is needed to battle Kitava - and that the Beast was his creation. A plan is formulated to return to Wraeclast to extract the essence from the Beast's dead body and use it to stop Kitava from destroying Oriath.

After travelling through Wraeclast once more and defeating the gods that have reawakened, the Exile returns to Oriath and finds that Innocence has returned. With Innocence reborn and amending for his past mistakes, Sin and Innocence take the Exile to Kitava's lair, and with their combined strength they destroy Kitava.

Development 
Path of Exile began when a small group of action role-playing game enthusiasts became frustrated by the lack of new releases in the genre and decided to develop their own game. It was developed under the radar for three years before being publicly announced on 1 September 2010. In the time since then, Grinding Gear Games has published a number of development posts on their website ranging from screen shots of new classes, monsters, and skills to presentations of game play or technical aspects.

The game's lead designer is Chris Wilson. He said the team drew inspiration from several earlier games, including action role-playing games such as the Diablo series (particularly Diablo II), Titan Quest, and Dungeon Siege, the collectible card game Magic: The Gathering, the massively multiplayer online role-playing game Guild Wars, and the role-playing video game franchise Final Fantasy (particularly the Materia system of Final Fantasy VII and the Sphere Grid system of Final Fantasy X).

Alpha started around June 2010, and ended when 0.9.0 was released in August 2011. Following a period under closed beta which players could pay to join, the developers started an open beta (ver. 0.10.0) on 23 January 2013 which was free to play with purchasable microtransactions. The game was patched for release version 1.0.0 on 23 October 2013. On this date, it was also made available on Steam. The game continues to be updated with new content and fixes on roughly a monthly basis.

The developers of Path of Exile stated that one of their core goals is to provide a genuinely free-to-play game financed only by "ethical micro-transactions". Players can create multiple accounts and even have more than one logged in at a time. Path of Exile mainly offers cosmetic item skins for players willing to spend money on the game, but it does also gate specific account features such as semi-automated public trading inventories or additional character slots behind a paywall. It is also possible for players to pay to create private, invite-only leagues, each secluded in its own economy. On 18 January 2017, Grinding Gear Games announced they would be expanding into the console market.

During closed beta, by 21 January 2013, Path of Exile received US$2.2m in crowd-sourced contributions.

During Exilecon in November 2019, Grinding Gear Games announced that a version of the game for mobile devices was also in development within their studio. One of the main topics discussed in the reveal video was the current trend in free-to-play mobile business models (such as "pay-to-win microtransactions, time gates, energy bars, random nag screens, notifications, video ads") and that POE Mobile would aim to avoid that approach, and retain the full gameplay of the desktop version. However, it was also stated that the mobile version was "experimental" and that continued development will be dependent upon the feedback from fans.

The game started with DirectX graphic rendering which supports a wide array of video cards. During Delirium league, February 2020, Grinding Gear Games (GGG) released a beta support version of Vulkan graphic rendering with the goal of providing more consistent game play and to collect feedback from players to improve the new mode through bug reports. Vulkan support implementation provided a smoother experience, reducing the number of times the games frames-per-second would drop or bottom out during high intensity game play. Vulkan beta support continued into Harvest with updates at the start of the league but negatively affected performance. Another release late into the Harvest league with 300+ changes that affects both DirectX and Vulkan beta support are still waiting for feedback.

In September 2020 through patch 3.11.2, Grinding Gear Games released a substantial code quality refactoring which required a full game download to deploy. The release includes: optimized future game patching for stand-alone and Steam game store versions, game file storage which improves HDD game load time, compressed and sharper texture quality, audio quality improvements, graphic engine improvements, a first-ever Apple macOS version release and Epic Game Store version release.

Expansions

Reception 

Path of Exile received "generally favorable reviews" according to review aggregator Metacritic. Critics praised the innovations to the action role-playing systems from its predecessors such as the Diablo series. Destructoids Patrick Hancock praised the world design, remarking that it "has a grimy, grungy, uncomfortable feel to it that constantly makes the player feel slightly off just for inhabiting it".

Kyle Hillard of Game Informer was critical on how the game "throws a lot at you with little direction", adding that "the experience is not friendly to newcomers". Eurogamer was not impressed by the graphics and presentation, saying that "Path of Exile doesn't have Torchlight 2s sense of style or Diablo 3s polish".

Path of Exile was named 2013 PC Game of the Year by GameSpot, and best PC role-playing game of 2013 by IGN. By February 2014, the game had five million registered players. IGN'''s Leif Johnson remarked how Path of Exile was "into far darker territory than I'd seen in other contemporary action-RPGs".

In 2020, it won the award for "Best Evolving Game" at the 16th British Academy Games Awards.

 Sequel 
In November 2019, Grinding Gear Games announced the sequel, Path of Exile 2 during their Exilecon. Previously known as Path of Exile 4.0.0 (working title), the sequel introduced a new 7 act storyline campaign with a major overhaul of the engine and gameplay. However, both Path of Exile and Path of Exile 2 share the same game client and end-game system, leaving the player a choice to play the Path of Exile or the sequel campaigns before reaching the end-game. Players can also interact with each other regardless of their choice of campaign.

A Beta version of Path of Exile 2'' was expected to release in "very late" 2020. However, it was delayed due to COVID-19 lockdown in New Zealand as well as China and the rest of the world where the outsourcing companies are located. It is now expected to release in 2024.

References

External links
 

2013 video games
Action role-playing video games
Dark fantasy video games
Free-to-play video games
Multiplayer online games
Online-only games
PlayStation 4 games
Role-playing video games
Video games developed in New Zealand
Windows games
Xbox One games
Xbox One X enhanced games
Video games using procedural generation
Video games with expansion packs
Video games containing battle passes
BAFTA winners (video games)
Garena games
Kakao Games games